Drexel University is a private university located in Philadelphia, Pennsylvania, United States. The 16th largest private university in the nation, Drexel is made up of nine colleges and four schools, most of which serve both undergraduate and graduate students. It offers 96 undergraduate degree programs, 88 master's programs, and 35 doctoral programs. Drexel was founded as a technical school in 1891 for the "improvement of industrial education as a means of opening better and wider avenues of employment to young men and women."  Drexel began awarding undergraduate degrees in 1914, starting with the Bachelor of Science in engineering; before that, Drexel granted certificates or diplomas in the field of enrollment. In 1931, Drexel began offering graduate degrees through the School of Home Economics.

Since its founding the university has graduated over 100,000 alumni. Certificate-earning alumni such as artist Violet Oakley and illustrator Frank Schoonover reflect the early emphasis on art as part of the university's curriculum. With World War II, the university's technical programs swelled, and as a result Drexel graduated alumni such as Paul Baran, one of the founding fathers of the Internet and one of the inventors of the packet switching network, and Norman Joseph Woodland the inventor of barcode technology. In addition to its emphasis on technology Drexel has graduated several notable athletes such as National Basketball Association (NBA) basketball players Michael Anderson and Malik Rose, and several notable business people such as Raj Gupta, former President and Chief executive officer (CEO) of Rohm and Haas, and Kenneth C. Dahlberg, former CEO of Science Applications International Corporation (SAIC).

Notable alumni
 A "—" indicates that the information is unknown.
Degree abbreviations
Cert – Certificate
BS – Bachelor of Science
Postgraduate degrees:
MA – Master of Arts
MBA – Master of Business Administration
MD – Doctor of Medicine
MS – Master of Science
PhD – Doctor of Philosophy

Business

Humanities

Architects

Arts and entertainment

Education

Bret Myers (born 1980), soccer player and professor

Medicine and health
The Drexel University College of Medicine retroactively considers graduates from all of the medical institutes that it has acquired to be alumni of the College of Medicine and Drexel University.  This includes MCP Hahnemann University (1993–2002), Woman's Medical College of Pennsylvania (1850–1993), and Hahnemann Medical College of Philadelphia (1848–1993).
DUCOM – Drexel University College of Medicine 
HMC – Hahnemann Medical College
MCP – Medical College of Pennsylvania
WMCP – Woman's Medical College of Pennsylvania

Politics and public service

Science and engineering

NASA

Sports

References
General

Specific

External links

Drexel University Alumni Association

Lists of people by university or college in Pennsylvania